Long Meadow is an historic house in Carters Valley in Hawkins County, Tennessee, near Surgoinsville. It was built in 1762 and is considered to be Tennessee's oldest wooden structure. It was erected on land that its builder, William Young, had received through a royal land grant.  The house was originally a log structure, with several additions added in the 19th century.

It was listed on the National Register of Historic Places in 1974.

See also
List of the oldest buildings in Tennessee

References

Houses on the National Register of Historic Places in Tennessee
Houses completed in 1762
Houses in Hawkins County, Tennessee
Pre-statehood history of Tennessee
National Register of Historic Places in Hawkins County, Tennessee
1762 establishments in the Thirteen Colonies